"Scared to Live" is a song by Canadian singer the Weeknd from his fourth studio album After Hours. He performed the song for the first time on March 8, 2020, with American musician Oneohtrix Point Never, during an episode of Saturday Night Live. The SNL version of the song was officially released alongside the deluxe edition of its parent album on March 23, 2020. The Weeknd wrote and produced the song with Max Martin and Oscar Holter, writing credits also going to Belly and Oneohtrix Point Never. Elton John and Bernard Taupin received additional songwriting credits for the interpolation of John's 1970 single "Your Song".

Background and promotion
In early February 2020, SNL confirmed that it was going to have the Weeknd as a musical guest on March 7, 2020. During the episode, the Weeknd performed the comedic skit "On the Couch" with Kenan Thompson and Chris Redd, and two songs from his album After Hours: the single "Blinding Lights" and the previously unreleased "Scared to Live" with Oneohtrix Point Never. The studio version of the song was then released on March 20, 2020, alongside the rest of the album.

In an interview with Variety, Elton John shared, "Abel has his own unique artistic voice — that's the hallmark of a genuinely great, long-term artist. I'm utterly thrilled that the DNA for 'Your Song' has found its way into 'Scared to Live'. It's the greatest compliment a songwriter can ever receive."

Lyrics and composition
"Scared to Live" has been described as a synth-pop ballad that maintains the strong traditional pop and adult contemporary sonics of John's "Your Song". Lyrically, it details the ending of a relationship the Weeknd had with a former lover that left them questioning if they could ever discover love again. The Weeknd encourages his past partner to move on from their past and find themselves, apologizing for the faults he made while still yearning for the connection that they once had.

Critical reception
The song received universal critical acclaim and was considered a highlight from its parent album, with the ballad's minimalistic nature, sincere lyrics, and the Weeknd's vocals receiving particular praise. Journalists also commended the maturity in the song's lyrics, while noting its sound as being reminiscent of ballads performed by Phil Collins in the past. Vibe writer Jack Riedy complimented the imagery, “The listener can practically see the disco ball spinning over a gaggle of youths at their prom’s last dance as Tesfaye urges them don’t be scared to live again”.

Seth Wilson of Slant wrote that the song "displays the grandeur of a pop ballad, with a swooning earworm of a chorus and lyrics that tenderly reflect on a past love, and with a maturity that comes only with hindsight. The song nearly edges into schmaltz, but it's full of surprises, including a nod to Elton John's 'Your Song' that's so well integrated into the chorus it's easy to miss." Micah Peters from The Ringer called the composition "a soaring ballad in which The Weeknd expresses joy and pain where once there was crushing melancholy". NME reviewer Will Richard named the piece a "shimmering, emotive ballad". Craig Jenkins of Vulture praised the song's "glistening synths over trap drums with delightful deviations. The writing’s tight and there’s a cohesion of sound and vision". In an AllMusic review, Andy Kellman states that "Scared to Live" is "so clean and down the middle that it resembles a box-office crossover bid from an artiste swallowing his pride to record a tame song. It is one of Tesfaye's best performances, his voice soaring and swooping, signifying numbness and codependency, sorrowful about wasted time while encouraging emotional convalescence".

Commercial performance
Following the releasing of its parent album, "Scared to Live" debuted at number 24 on the US Billboard Hot 100 dated April 4, 2020. It was the fifth highest charting track from After Hours.

Live performances
The song was first performed live on SNL alongside "Blinding Lights" on March 7, 2020. The performance was introduced by Daniel Craig and featured the Weeknd wearing a bandaged, bloodied nose and red suit, as part of a persona portrayed in the art direction for the After Hours era. Oneohtrix Point Never accompanied him on the synthesizer.

Personnel
Credits adapted from Genius. 
 The Weeknd – songwriting, vocals, production, keyboards, programming, bass, guitar, drums
 Max Martin – songwriting, production, keyboards, programming, bass, guitar, drums
 Oscar Holter – songwriting, production, keyboards, programming, bass, guitar, drums
 Belly – songwriting
 Oneohtrix Point Never – songwriting, synthesizer programming (SNL Live)
 Elton John – songwriting
 Bernard Taupin – songwriting
 Dave Kutch – mastering 
 Kevin Peterson – mastering
 Shin Kamiyama - engineering
 Sam Holland - engineering
 Michael Ilbert - engineering
 Serban Ghenea - mixing engineer
 John Hanes - mixing engineer

Charts

Release history

References

External links
 
 

2020 songs
The Weeknd songs
Songs written by the Weeknd
Songs written by Belly (rapper)
Songs written by Max Martin
Songs written by Oscar Holter
Elton John
Song recordings produced by Max Martin
Song recordings produced by the Weeknd
2020s ballads
Pop ballads
Traditional pop songs
Canadian synth-pop songs